Tenaturris multilineata is a species of sea snail, a marine gastropod mollusk in the family Mangeliidae.

Description
The length of the shell attains 4.6 mm.

The small shell is golden yellow with many white lines. It contains 6 whorls with 8–10 longitudinal ribs expanding at the base. The spiral sculpture consists of close, decurrent, inequal striae. The suture is deep. The sinus is large. The siphonal canal is very short.

Distribution
This species occurs in the Caribbean Sea off Jamaica.

References

External links
 
 

multilineata
Gastropods described in 1845